Cristinia is a genus of fungi belonging to the family Stephanosporaceae.

The genus has cosmopolitan distribution.

Species
Species:

Cristinia artheniensis 
Cristinia brevicellularis 
Cristinia coprophila

References

Agaricales
Agaricales genera